Coprinopsis is a genus of mushrooms in the family Psathyrellaceae.  Coprinopsis was split out of the genus Coprinus based on molecular data. The species Coprinopsis cinerea (=Coprinus cinereus) is a model organism for mushroom-forming basidiomycota, and its genome has recently been sequenced completely.

Selected species 

For complete list see List of Coprinopsis species

 Coprinopsis acuminata (humpback inkcap)
 Coprinopsis atramentaria (common inkcap)
 Coprinopsis episcopalis (mitre inkcap)
 Coprinopsis jonesii (bonfire inkcap)
 Coprinopsis lagopus (hare's foot inkcap)
 Coprinopsis nivea (snowy inkcap)
 Coprinopsis picacea (magpie inkcap)
 Coprinopsis variegata (the scaly ink cap or the feltscale inky cap)

References

External links

 
Agaricales genera